Floy Alton Terry (November 24, 1912 – July 13, 2003) was an American javelin thrower. He placed sixth at the 1936 Olympics and third in at the 1937 AAU championships.

Competing for Hardin-Simmons, Terry won the 1936 NCAA Championships with a meet-record 226-2 (68.94) to win by over 16 feet. The meet record stood until 1952.

References

1912 births
2003 deaths
Sportspeople from Texas
People from Brady, Texas
American male javelin throwers
Olympic track and field athletes of the United States
Athletes (track and field) at the 1936 Summer Olympics
Track and field athletes from Texas